is a Japanese anime director. In 2002, Ishihira was put in charge of directing an anime for the first time with Ichi the Killer: Episode 0. Since then, some of the series he has directed include Fairy Tail and Log Horizon.

Biography
Ishihira started out by doing scenarios for both anime and video games. However, he later decided to focus solely on the former. In 2002, Ishihira was put in charge of directing an anime series for the first time with Ichi the Killer: Episode 0. In 2007, he was put in charge of directing for his first TV series, Tokyo Majin.

In 2009, Ishihira directed the anime adaptation of Fairy Tail, which garnered a positive response from critics. In Southeast Asia, it won Animax Asia's Anime of the Year award in 2010. In 2012, the series won the Meilleur Anime Japonais (best Japanese anime) award at the 19th Anime & Manga Grand Prix in Paris, France. In 2021, he directed the anime adaptation of Tsukimichi: Moonlit Fantasy, which has the highest overseas sales record among all Nippon TV anime.

Works

TV series
 Tokyo Majin (2007) (director)
 Fairy Tail (2009–2019) (director)
 Log Horizon (2013–2021) (director)
 Super Lovers (2016–2017) (director)
 The Seven Heavenly Virtues (2018) (director)
 Talentless Nana (2020) (director)
 Edens Zero (2021–present) (chief director)
 Tsukimichi: Moonlit Fantasy (2021–present) (director)
 Sasaki and Miyano (2022) (director)
Reincarnated as a Sword (2022) (director)

Original video animation
 Ichi the Killer: Episode 0 (2002) (director)
 Tenbatsu! Angel Rabbie (2004) (director)
 Air Gear: Break on the Sky (2010–2011) (director)
 Sasaki and Miyano (2022) (director)

Films
 Sasaki and Miyano: Sotsugyō-hen (2023) (director)

References

External links
 

Anime directors
Japanese film directors
Japanese storyboard artists
Japanese television directors
Living people
Year of birth missing (living people)